Cryptoptila crypsilopha is a species of moth of the family Tortricidae. It is found in Australia, where it has been recorded from Queensland.

The wingspan is about 30 mm.  The forewings are grey, with a suffused, ferruginous, subcostal streak and a similar, median, longitudinal streak, as well as a few darker strigulae (fine streaks) in the terminal area. The hindwings are grey with a subapical costal tuft of scales.

References

Moths described in 1925
Archipini